There are 52 chorale cantatas by Johann Sebastian Bach surviving in at least one complete version. Around 40 of these were composed during his second year as Thomaskantor in Leipzig, which started after Trinity Sunday 4 June 1724, and form the backbone of his chorale cantata cycle. The eldest known cantata by Bach, an early version of Christ lag in Todes Banden, BWV 4, presumably written in 1707, was a chorale cantata. The last chorale cantata he wrote in his second year in Leipzig was Wie schön leuchtet der Morgenstern, BWV 1, first performed on Palm Sunday, 25 March 1725. In the ten years after that he wrote at least a dozen further chorale cantatas and other cantatas that were added to his chorale cantata cycle.

Lutheran hymns, also known as chorales, have a prominent place in the liturgy of that denomination. A chorale cantata is a church cantata based on a single hymn, both its text and tune. Bach was not the first to compose them, but for his 1724-25 second Leipzig cantata cycle he developed a specific format: in this format the opening movement is a chorale fantasia on the first stanza of the hymn, with the hymn tune appearing as a cantus firmus. The last movement is a four-part harmonisation of the chorale tune for the choir, with the last stanza of the hymn as text. While the text of the stanzas used for the outer movements was retained unchanged, the text of the inner movements of the cantata, a succession of recitatives alternating with arias, was paraphrased from the inner stanzas of the hymn.

Context 

Martin Luther advocated the use of vernacular hymns during services.

Leipzig had a strong tradition of sacred hymns.

Bach's duties as an organist included accompanying congregational singing, and he was familiar with the Lutheran hymns. Some of Bach's earliest church cantatas include chorale settings, although he usually incorporates them into just one or two movements. Hymn stanzas are most typically included in his cantatas as the closing four-part chorale. In his passions, Bach used chorale settings to complete a scene.

Before Bach chorale cantatas, that is, cantatas entirely based on both the text and the melody of a single Lutheran hymn, had been composed by among others Samuel Scheidt, Johann Erasmus Kindermann, Johann Pachelbel and Dieterich Buxtehude. Sebastian Knüpfer, Johann Schelle and Johann Kuhnau, Bach's predecessors as Thomaskantor, had composed them. Contemporary to Bach, Christoph Graupner and Georg Philipp Telemann were composers of chorale cantatas.

From his appointment as Thomaskantor in Leipzig end of May 1723 to Trinity Sunday a year later Bach had been presenting the church cantatas for each Sunday and holiday of the liturgical year, his first annual cycle of cantatas. His ensuing second cycle started with a stretch of at least 40 new chorale cantatas, up to Palm Sunday of 1725. A week later, for Easter, he presented a revised version of the early Christ lag in Todes Banden chorale cantata.

Bach's chorale cantatas 

The oldest known chorale cantate by Bach, which may well have been the first cantata he composed, was likely composed in 1707 for a presentation in Mühlhausen. All further extant chorale cantatas were composed in Leipzig. There Bach started composing chorale cantatas as part of his second cantata cycle in 1724, a year after having been appointed as Thomaskantor. Up to at least 1735 he amended that cycle transforming it into what is known as his chorale cantata cycle. With its 52 extant cantatas for known occasions, out of 64 for a full cantata cycle in a city like Leipzig where during the largest part of advent and lent a silent time was observed, the cycle however remains incomplete.

Possibly the inspiration for starting a chorale cantata cycle in 1724 is linked to it being exactly two centuries after the publication of the first Lutheran hymnals. The first of these early hymnals is the Achtliederbuch, containing eight hymns and five melodies. Four chorale cantatas use text and/or melody of a hymn in that early publication (BWV 2, 9, 38 and 117). Another 1524 hymnal is the Erfurt Enchiridion: BWV 62, 91, 96, 114, 121 and 178 are based on hymns from that publication. BWV 14, and 125 were based on hymns from Eyn geystlich Gesangk Buchleyn, also published in 1524.

The usual format of Bach's chorale cantatas is:
 First movement (or, when the cantata starts with an instrumental sinfonia, the first movement with vocalists): choral movement, usually a chorale fantasia, that takes its text unmodified from the first stanza of the Lutheran hymn on which the cantata is based. In this movement the chorale melody most often appears as a cantus firmus in the soprano part.
 Inner movements: usually three to five movements which are recitatives alternating with arias, based on the inner stanzas of the hymn. For the chorale cantatas Bach premiered from 11 June 1724 to 25 March 1725 the text of these inner movements is almost always a rephrasing, by an unknown author, of the hymn's inner stanzas. For chorale cantatas composed before and after that period Bach often uses unmodified hymn text for the inner movements of his chorale cantatas. When the text of all stanzas of the hymn is used unmodified that is called per omnes versus.
 Last movement: four-part homophonic setting for SATB voices of the hymn tune, taking the unmodified last stanza of the hymn as text.

In Bach's time the congregation would have sung during some of the services in which the cantatas were performed, but it is not known whether the congregation would have joined the choir in singing the chorales in the cantatas themselves. On the other hand, although Bach's chorale arrangements can be tricky for amateur singers, sometimes in 21st-century performances of the cantatas and passions audience participation is encouraged. For example, the Monteverdi Choir encouraged audience participation in a 2013 performance of the  cantata.

Easter 1707?
 (Easter):  (K 4), early version, assumed to have been presented in Mühlhausen. In that case it would be Bach's first documented cantata: the cantata is however only fully extant in its later versions. It was performed then as the test piece for the post of Organist at the Church Divi Blasii in that town.

Reformation Day 1723?
 ? (Reformation Day): Ein feste Burg ist unser Gott, BWV 80b (K 95), first Leipzig version, after Alles, was von Gott geboren, BWV 80a (not a chorale cantata but basis for BWV 80b), which had been performed on Oculi Sunday in Weimar in 1715 or 1716. There is however uncertainty when BWV 80b was first presented.

Easter 1724
During his first year in Leipzig Bach presented a reworked version of his 1707 Easter cantata in Leipzig:
  (Easter): , BWV 4 (K 4), Leipzig version, first performance.  Bach changed the last movement to reflect the current one (4-part Chorale setting).  The first version (1707 & 1708) had the last verse (last movement) using the same music as the 1st verse (2nd movement).

First Sunday after Trinity 1724 to Easter 1725
The first four chorale cantatas presented in 1724 appear to form a set: Bach gave the cantus firmus of the chorale tune to the soprano in the first, to the alto in the second, to the tenor in the third, and to the bass in the fourth. He varied the style of chorale fantasia in those four cantatas: French Overture in BWV 20, Chorale motet in BWV 2, Italian concerto in BWV 7, and vocal and instrumental counterpoint in BWV 135.
 11 June 1724 (Trinity I): , based on Johann von Rist's "O Ewigkeit, du Donnerwort" which had appeared under the title "Eine sehr ernstliche und ausführliche Betrachtung der zukünftigen und unendlichen Ewigkeit" (a very serious and elaborate reflection on the impending and endless eternity) in 1642. The chorale melody had appeared in Johann Crüger's Praxis pietatis melica, 5th edition, in 1653, and was a modified version of Johann Schop's setting of "Wach auf, mein Geist, erhebe dich" (Johann Risten Himlische Lieder, 1641–42).
 18 June 1724 (Trinity II): .
 24 June 1724 (St. John's Day):  (K 76).
 25 June 1724 (Trinity III):  (K 77).
 2 July 1724 (Visitation, that year also Trinity IV): Meine Seel erhebt den Herren, BWV 10 (K 78). 
 9 July 1724 (Trinity V): Wer nur den lieben Gott läßt walten, BWV 93 (K 79).
 23 July 1724 (Trinity VII): Was willst du dich betrüben, BWV 107 (K 80).
 30 July 1724 (Trinity VIII): Wo Gott der Herr nicht bei uns hält, BWV 178 (K 81).
 6 August 1724 (Trinity IX): Was frag ich nach der Welt, BWV 94 (K 82).
 13 August 1724 (Trinity X): Nimm von uns, Herr, du treuer Gott, BWV 101 (K 83).
 20 August 1724 (Trinity XI): Herr Jesu Christ, du höchstes Gut, BWV 113 (K 84).
 3 September 1724 (Trinity XIII): Allein zu dir, Herr Jesu Christ, BWV 33 (K 85).
 10 September 1724 (Trinity XIV): Jesu, der du meine Seele, BWV 78 (K 86).
 17 September 1724 (Trinity XV): Was Gott tut, das ist wohlgetan, BWV 99 (K 87).
 24 September 1724 (Trinity XVI): Liebster Gott, wenn werd ich sterben? BWV 8 (K 88).
 29 September 1724 (St. Michael's Day): Herr Gott, dich loben alle wir, BWV 130 (K 89).
 1 October 1724 (Trinity XVII): Ach, lieben Christen, seid getrost, BWV 114 (K 90).
 8 October 1724 (Trinity XVIII): Herr Christ, der einge Gottessohn, BWV 96 (K 91).
 15 October 1724 (Trinity XIX): Wo soll ich fliehen hin, BWV 5 (K 92).
 22 October 1724 (Trinity XX): Schmücke dich, o liebe Seele, BWV 180 (K 93).
 29 October 1724 (Trinity XXI): Aus tiefer Not schrei ich zu dir, BWV 38 (K 94).
 ? (Reformation Day): Ein feste Burg ist unser Gott, BWV 80b (K 95) – there is however uncertainty whether an early version of BWV 80 was composed for, or even performed at, 31 October 1724.
 5 November 1724 (Trinity XXII): Mache dich, mein Geist, bereit, BWV 115 (K 96).
 12 November 1724 (Trinity XXIII): Wohl dem, der sich auf seinen Gott, BWV 139 (K 97).
 19 November 1724 (Trinity XXIV): Ach wie flüchtig, ach wie nichtig, BWV 26 (K 98).
 26 November 1724 (Trinity XXV): Du Friedefürst, Herr Jesu Christ, BWV 116 (K 99).
  (Advent I), : Nun komm, der Heiden Heiland, BWV 62 (K 100), based on Luther's "Nun komm, der Heiden Heiland" (Erfurt Enchiridion, 1524).
  (Christmas): Gelobet seist du, Jesu Christ, BWV 91 (K 101), based on Luther's "Gelobet seist du, Jesu Christ"  (Eyn geystlich Gesangk Buchleyn, 1524).
  (Second Day of Christmas), : Christum wir sollen loben schon, BWV 121 (K 102), based on Luther's "Christum wir sollen loben schon" (Erfurt Enchiridion, 1524).
  (Third Day of Christmas): Ich freue mich in dir, BWV 133 (K 103), based on Caspar Ziegler's "Ich freue mich in dir" (1697).
  (Christmas I): Das neugeborne Kindelein, BWV 122 (K 104), based on Cyriakus Schneegass' "Das neugeborne Kindelein" (1597).
  (New Year): Jesu, nun sei gepreiset, BWV 41 (K 105), based on Johannes Hermann's "Jesu, nun sei gepreiset zu diesem neuen Jahr" (1593).
  (Epiphany): Liebster Immanuel, Herzog der Frommen, BWV 123 (K 106), based on Ahasverus Fritsch's "Liebster Immanuel, Herzog der Frommen" (1679).
  (Epiphany I): Meinen Jesum laß ich nicht, BWV 124 (K 107), based on Christian Keymann's "Meinen Jesum laß ich nicht", on a melody by Andreas Hammerschmidt (1658).
  (Epiphany II): Ach Gott, wie manches Herzeleid, BWV 3 (K 108), based on "Ach Gott, wie manches Herzeleid" (1679), attributed to Martin Moller and sung to the hymn tune of "Herr Jesu Christ, meins Lebens Licht" (Lochamer-Liederbuch, 1455).
  (Epiphany III): Was mein Gott will, das g'scheh allzeit, BWV 111 (K 109), based on Albert, Duke of Prussia's "Was mein Gott will, gescheh allzeit" (1547, with a fourth and final stanza added in Nürnberg in 1555), on a melody by Claudin de Sermisy (chanson "Il me suffit de tous mes maulx", 1528, with an earlier contrafactum, on a Dutch text, in 1540).
  (Septuagesima): Ich hab in Gottes Herz und Sinn, BWV 92 (K 110), based on Paul Gerhardt's "" (1647), sung to the same melody by de Sermisy as the chorale Bach had used for the cantata he had presented a week earlier.
  (Purification): Mit Fried und Freud ich fahr dahin, BWV 125 (K 111), based on Luther's German Nunc dimittis "Mit Fried und Freud ich fahr dahin" (Eyn geystlich Gesangk Buchleyn, 1524).
  (Sexagesima): Erhalt uns, Herr, bei deinem Wort, BWV 126 (K 112), based on "Erhalt uns, Herr, bei deinem Wort" by Luther and Justus Jonas (1541).
  (Estomihi): Herr Jesu Christ, wahr' Mensch und Gott, BWV 127 (K 113), based on Paul Eber's "Herr Jesu Christ, wahr Mensch und Gott" (1557), sung to the melody of "Wenn einer schon ein Haus aufbaut" (Ambrosius Lobwasser's paraphrase of Psalm 127 published in Louis Bourgeois' 1551 edition of the Genevan Psalter).
  (Annunciation, that year coinciding with Palm Sunday): Wie schön leuchtet der Morgenstern, BWV 1 (K 114), based on Philipp Nicolai's "Wie schön leuchtet der Morgenstern" (1597, published 1599).
  (Easter): , BWV 4 (K 4), Leipzig version, second performance. The first version of this cantata had likely been composed 18 years earlier. Bach probably added 3 trombone parts only for this 1725 performance which is considered the final version of the cantata. It is a  chorale cantata based on "Christ lag in Todes Banden", an Easter hymn by Luther and/or Johann Walter. The Medieval model for the text of this hymn and the melody is based on the old German hymn "Christ ist erstanden". The German hymn was published in 1524 in the Erfurt Enchiridion (under the title "Christ ist erstanden gebessert") as well as in Eyn geystlich Gesangk Buchleyn.

Ascension to Trinity 1725
Two cantatas opening with a chorale fantasia usually grouped with the chorale cantatas
  (Ascension): Auf Christi Himmelfahrt allein, BWV 128
  (Pentecost Monday): Also hat Gott die Welt geliebt, BWV 68

Later additions to the chorale cantata cycle
After Trinity 1725 Bach added further cantatas to the chorale cantata cycle, at least up to 1735:
 19 August 1725 (Trinity XII): Lobe den Herren, den mächtigen König der Ehren, BWV 137, a per omnes versus chorale cantata.
  (New Year I = Christmas II; there hadn't been a Sunday between New Year and Epiphany in 1725): Ach Gott, wie manches Herzeleid, BWV 58 (K 161), early version. This version is partly lost: the continuo part is all that is left from its middle movement. The other four movements are to a large extent identical to the 1730s version of this cantata (however without oboes in the outer movements).
 129 (1727) 
  (31 October, Reformation Day): Ein feste Burg ist unser Gott, BWV 80 (K 95), second Leipzig version. An early version of this cantata, BWV 80b, may have been composed or performed as early as 1723. The trumpet parts in the second Leipzig version were possibly a later addition by W. F. Bach. Luther's "Ein feste Burg ist unser Gott" (A Mighty Fortress Is Our God) was probably written and published in the late 1520s. Its oldest extant print is in Andrew Rauscher's 1531 hymnal.
 112 (1731) 
 140 (1731) 
 177 (1732) 
 9 (1732)
  or : Ach Gott, wie manches Herzeleid, BWV 58  (K 161), later version as published by the Bach Gesellschaft in Vol. 122, p. 133 ff. In this version a new composition replaces the third movement, and oboes are added in the outer movements.  The cantata's libretto, by Christoph Birkmann, is not completely consistent with the chorale cantata format, but the cantata was certainly intended as an addition to the cycle. The cantata is unusual in combining the text of two hymns (Martin Moller's 1587 "Ach Gott, wie manches Herzeleid" and Martin Behm's 1610 "Herr Jesu Christ, meins Lebens Licht", both sung to the same 15th-century hymn tune), and in ending on a chorale fantasia instead of a four-part chorale. The hymn tune had first appeared in the Lochamer-Liederbuch (1451–1460). In a strict sense it is thus not a chorale cantata.
 14 (1735)

Chorale cantatas with unknown liturgical function
For some chorale cantatas, written from 1728 to 1735, it is not known for which occasion they were written, and whether they were intended to belong to a cycle: 
 1728–31: Sei Lob und Ehr dem höchsten Gut, BWV 117
 1730: Nun danket alle Gott, BWV 192 (incomplete)
 1732–35: Was Gott tut, das ist wohlgetan, BWV 100
 1734?: In allen meinen Taten, BWV 97

Notes

References

External links 
Sortable Index of the Chorales by J.S. Bach at 

German music history
Baroque music

18th century in music